This is a list of Swedish television related events from 2015.

Events
24 April - Olympic gold medal alpine skier Ingemar Stenmark and his partner Cecilia Ehrling win the tenth season of Let's Dance.
23 May - Sweden wins the 60th Eurovision Song Contest in Vienna, Austria. The winning song is "Heroes", performed by Måns Zelmerlöw.
29 May - Footballer Anton Hysén and his partner Sigrid Bernson, who won the seventh season of Let's Dance beat actor Morgan Alling and his partner Helena Fransson who finished third in the fourth season to win Let's Dance 10 år.
4 December - Martin Almgren wins the eleventh season of Idol.
20 December - Christian Sahlström wins the seventh season of Big Brother.

Debuts

SVT

TV4

Television shows

2000s
Idol (2004-2011, 2013–present)
The Scandinavian version of Big Brother (2005-2006, 2014–present)
Let's Dance (2006–present)
Talang Sverige (2007-2011, 2014–present)

Ending this year

Births

Deaths

See also
2015 in Sweden

References

External links